Kim Herzinger is a critic, a Pushcart Prize-winning writer of fiction, and the editor of three Donald Barthelme collections. He taught at the University of Southern Mississippi and now owns and operates Left Bank Books in New York City.

Was recently filmed as a random "contestant" on the popular Discovery Channel show  "Cash Cab" .  On the episode airing July 23, 2010, he missed the first three questions, and was kicked out of the cab.

External links
Left Bank Books, NYC - Official Site

American fiction writers
Living people
University of Southern Mississippi faculty
Year of birth missing (living people)